is a music video compilation released by Miyavi on December 20, 2006. It contains the videos for all singles from the Myv Pops album, extras include making-of features, television ads, footage of Miyavi filmed in Korea and touring footage presented in a documentary-like manner and quality.

The compilation was reissued on November 21, 2007, making all of the original limited edition content available again. The reissue was also a limited release.

Track listing

Personnel
Tomomi Ozaki – executive producer
Atsushi Kitamura – executive producer

Music videos
Koichi Kotani – producer
Koichiro Nogawa – producer
Kazuyoshi Oku – director (Track 1 and 2)
Tsuyoshi Inoue – director (Track 3, 5 and 6)
Naoko Miyowaka – director (Track 4)

Live and documentary footage
Ryo Nagai – live director
Shingo Goto – live director

Miyavi video albums